Unguturu is a village in Krishna district of the Indian state of Andhra Pradesh.

Notable people

 Gudavalli Ramabrahmam (1898-1946), social reformer and Telugu film director
 Unguturu Venkata Sitarama Anajaneyulu (1947 - 2011), Founding members and General Manager SV Bhakti Channel (SVBC), Director Doordarsha Kendra Tirupati and President Tirupati Film Society. A noted personality in Tirupati who was the cause of SV Bhakti Channel today.
 Viswanatha Satyanarayana (1895-1976), Telugu author and poet
 Tripuraneni Ramaswamy (1887-1943), lawyer, playwright and reformer active among the Telugu-speaking people
 Tripuraneni Gopichand (1910-1962), Telugu short story writer, novelist, editor, essayist, playwright and film director
 Dr. Tripuraneni Venkateswara Rao (1930?-2007), literary critic, author of Tripuraneni Ramayanam, founder of Spartek Group
 Dr. Tripuraneni Hanuman Chowdary, founding chairman and managing director of Videsh Sanchar Nigam Limited (VSNL), India's international telecommunications corporation; founder of the Center for Telecommunications Management and Studies (CTMS)
 P. S. Ramamohan Rao (born 1934), politician, Governor of Tamil Nadu from 2002 to 2004, former Director General of Police of Andhra Pradesh
 Vasuki Sunkavalli, lawyer, model, India's nominee for Miss Universe 2011 (She is from Unguturu, West Godavari District)
 Chinta Visweswara Rao, industrialist, chairman and managing director of Krishnapatnam Port Company

See also 
Villages in Unguturu mandal

References

Villages in Krishna district
Mandal headquarters in Krishna district